The Vaibhavwadi train crash was a fatal train derailment near the village of Vaibhavwadi in Sindhudurg district, Maharashtra in India on 23 June 2003.

Overview 

The accident occurred at 10.30pm, when the train, bound for Mumbai from Karwar derailed suddenly as it travelled through a ravine outside the town. The train was a Central Railway's Holiday Special, and had numerous families aboard at the time of the crash. The track had been covered by several large boulders earlier in the day from a landslide down the ravine's side, which had not been noticed due to the remote location. When the train struck the boulders, the engine and first three carriages were thrown in the air by the force of the derailment, and crumpled upon impact.

The rescue operation was difficult, because unlike with most Indian train accidents, local people did not see or hear the crash, and thus it was hours before the emergency services were notified, and even longer before they arrived, travelling on bad roads in bad weather. Special emergency trains could not be used either, because of the dangers of further landslides. Thus it was the morning before many of the survivors were freed by soldiers and emergency services.

52 people were killed in the crash and over 100 injured, including 26 in a critical state. Many of those injured in the crash had died in the night because of the difficulties inherent in reaching them in the darkness. The customary one lakh compensation was presented to the families of those killed.

The cause of the crash was determined to have been rocks and earth, which tumbled onto the tracks ahead following a series of earth tremors, to which this area is especially prone. These then caused the engine to leave the rails when it collided with them. There was controversy about the accident though, because the company which runs the service, the Konkan Railway Corporation, has just developed a new type of Anti Collision Device which would have prevented the crash. The device had been sold to other Indian and foreign companies, but had not yet been installed on their own vehicles.

Similar accidents 

Landslides can be classed with washaways.

  – Tangiwai disaster
  – Veligonda train disaster
  – Karanjadi train crash
  – Bethrungra – 1885 – 7 killed when train derails at culvert washaway.

External links 
 Calcutta Telegraph News Report
 expressindia.com News Report
 Deccan Herald News Report

2003 disasters in India
Derailments in India
Railway accidents in 2003
History of Maharashtra (1947–present)
Railway accidents and incidents in Maharashtra
2003 in India
Sindhudurg district
June 2003 events in India